Terence George Miller (19 January 1918 – 17 January 2015) was a British academic and professor of geology. He was appointed Principal of the University of Rhodesia in 1967. During this period, his political views brought him hate mail and he rapidly came into conflict with the government. When in 1969 Rhodesia declared itself a republic, with a racist constitution, Prof. Miller resigned his position and returned to the UK, joining the University of Reading as visiting professor, before being appointed Director of the newly formed Polytechnic of North London in 1971.

Miller was one of a number of distinguished geologists who contributed to the UK's 2nd World War effort, as Major T.G. Miller. 
He died on 17 January 2015.

References

1918 births
2015 deaths
Heads of universities and colleges in Zimbabwe
Academic staff of the University of Zimbabwe
20th-century British geologists
Academics of the University of Reading
English people of Scottish descent
British expatriates in Rhodesia
British palaeontologists